Octagon Stone Schoolhouse, also known as The Stone Jug, is a historic one-room school building located at South Canaan Township, Wayne County, Pennsylvania.  It was built about 1830, and is an octagonal shaped, one-room, fieldstone building.  It was used as a school until 1900, after which it was used for storage.

It was added to the National Register of Historic Places in 1977.

See also
Sodom Schoolhouse

References

Octagonal school buildings in the United States
One-room schoolhouses in Pennsylvania
School buildings on the National Register of Historic Places in Pennsylvania
School buildings completed in 1830
Schools in Wayne County, Pennsylvania
1830 establishments in Pennsylvania
National Register of Historic Places in Wayne County, Pennsylvania